James Robert Hyde (born October 9, 1962) is an American actor, dancer, and former fashion model who played the role of Sam Bennett on the television soap opera Passions. He was born and raised in Lancaster, Ohio.

Biography

Hyde had roles in the films The Blackout and Let's Talk About Sex. The Blackout has not yet been released in the US.

He won an open casting call competition for Sunset Beach in 1996 and appeared in the promos for the show. He was cast for the recurring role of Neil Johansson on the television series Another World in 1997. He also had a short stint as Liam on the television series As the World Turns in 1999.

Hyde was picked as a dancer for British new wave band Dead or Alive, which was fronted by singer Pete Burns. Hyde toured in Japan and the US with the band in 1987, 1989 and 1990. He can be seen as one of the two dancers in the concert film Rip It Up Live, which was filmed at two of their Japanese concerts, and released on VHS in 1988. Additionally Hyde appeared in Dead or Alive's music videos for Turn Around & Count 2 Ten, Come Home With Me Baby and Your Sweetness is Your Weakness.

He also appeared in a minor role on the short-lived TV series, Mortal Kombat Conquest as a friend of Taja's, in the episode titled "Undying Dream".

Currently, he is working as a realtor for Pacific Union Los Angeles.

Hyde and his wife, Sue-Ling Garcia, were married in 1994 and they have a son, James Moses, born in 2004.

Filmography

External links
NBC Passions Official bio

1962 births
Living people
Male models from Ohio
People from Lancaster, Ohio
American male soap opera actors
Male actors from Ohio
American real estate brokers